The African Committee of Experts on the Rights and Welfare of the Child (ACERWC) was formed in July 2001, one and half years after the African Charter on the Rights and Welfare of the Child came into force. The Committee became operational in 2003.

Mission 

The ACERWC draws its mandate from articles 32–46 of the African Charter on the Rights and Welfare of the Child (ACRWC), which was adopted by the Organization of African Unity (OAU) Heads of State and Government on 11 July 1990 and came into force on 29 November 1999. As of June 2022, 50 AU Member States had ratified the Charter and five were still to ratify: Morocco, Sahrawi Republic, Somalia, South Sudan and Tunisia. (See https://au.int/treaties for the full list, including reservations by four ratifying states.)

Membership

The Committee is made of 11 members  who are elected by the Assembly of Heads of State and Government of the African Union. They serve in their personal capacities. They are elected by secret ballot from a list of people nominated by State Parties to the Charter (ACRWC Charter, article 34). Members were traditionally elected by the Executive Council and appointed by the Assembly. In February 2020, the Assembly decided to delegate its authority to the Executive Council to appoint members (Assembly/AU/Dec.760(XXXIII)).

Candidates are required to be of high moral standing, integrity, impartiality and competence in matters of the rights and welfare of children. Under the Charter, terms are for five years, but to avoid the departure of all 11 members after the first term, article 37 provided for the terms of two members to expire after two years and six after four years, as determined in a draw of lots by the AU Assembly Chairperson immediately after the first election. Article 37 originally stated that members could not be re-elected. In January 2015, the AU Assembly adopted an amendment to article 37(1) to provide for members to be re-elected once for a five-year term (Assembly/AU/Dec.548(XXIV)). The amendment entered into force on its adoption. 

Bureau members are elected from within the Committee for two-year terms (article 38). 

The criteria for the selection of members are:

 Members must be nationals of a State Party to the Children's Charter (i.e. a country that is a signatory);
 They must be individuals of high moral standing, integrity, impartiality and competence in matters of the rights and welfare of the child;
 Members are nominated by signatory countries and elected by the Assembly of Heads of State of the African Union;
 Members are elected for a term of five years and serve voluntarily in their individual capacity. They can be re-elected for one term following an amendment to article 37(1).

Statutory Meetings 

The Committee holds ordinary sessions twice a year, and an extraordinary session when necessary. Proceedings of the Committee’s sessions are available at www.acerwc.africa/sessions. Ordinary Session is the venue where States parties reports, CSOs complementary reports, communications, request for investigation and other requests submitted before the Committee are being examined. Some activities during the sessions are open while others are restricted.

The Committee may also convenes various meetings, seminars and workshops in line with its promotional mandate.

Current Committee members 

Elected and appointed by the Executive Council in February 2021 for five-year terms:
 
 Hon. Wilson Almeida Adao, Angola 
 Hon. Karoonawtee Chooramun, Mauritius 
 Hon. Aboubekrine El Jera, Mauritania  (re-appointed)
 Hon. Aver Gavar, Nigeria (second term)
 Hon. Anne Musiwa, Zimbabwe 
 Hon. Robert Doya Nanima, Uganda 
 Hon. Theophane Marie Xavier Nikyema, Burkina Faso 

June 2018 to June 2023

 Hon. Joseph Ndayisenga, Burundi (second term)
 Hon. Moushira Khattab, Egypt  
 Hon. Sidikou Aissatou, Niger (second term)

February 2019 to February 2024

Hon. Hermine Kembo Takam Gatsing, Cameroon

Former Committee members 

 Prof. Benyam Dawit Mezmur, Ethiopia, Chair Person, Term of office: July 2010-July 2015
 Mrs. Fatima Delladj-Sebaa, Algeria – 1st  Vice President, Term of Office: July 2010 – July 2015
 Prof. Julia Sloth-Nielsen, South Africa, 2nd Vice President, Term of Office: January 2011 – January 2016
 Dr. Clement Julius Mashamba, Tanzania – 3rd Vice-President, Term of Office: July 2010 – July 2015
 Justice Alfas Muvavarigwa Chitakunye, Zimbabwe, Rapporteur, Term of Office: July 2010 – July 2015
 Mrs. Sidikou Aissatou Alassane Moulaye, Niger -  Term of Office: May 2013 – May 2018
 Mr. Joseph Ndayisenga, Burundi, Term of Office: May 2013- May 2018
 Dr. Azza Ashmawy, Egypte, Term of Office: May 2013 – May 2018
 Mrs. Amal Muhammad El Henqari, Libya, Term of Office: July 2010 – July 2015
 Mrs. Félicité Muhimpundu, Rwanda, Term of Office: July 2010 – July 2015
 Mrs. Suzanne Aho-Assouma, Togo, Term of Office: May 2013 – May 2018

As at October 2008, the elected Committee of Experts were (name, country, position):

 Ms. Seynabou Ndiaye Diakhate, Sénégal, Chairperson
 Ms. Marie Chantal Koffi Appoh, Côte d'Ivoire, Vice-Chairperson
 Ms Boipelo Lucia Seitlhamo, Botswana, Rapporteur
 Hon. Justice Martha Koome, Kenya, Member
 Mrs. Mamosebi T. Pholo, Lesotho, Member
 Mr. Moussa Sissoko, Mali, Member
 Mrs. Dawlat Ibrahim Hassan, Egypt, Member
 Mr. Cyprien Adébayo, Benin, Member
 Mrs. Agnès Kabore, Burkino Faso, Member
 Mrs. Andrianirainy Rasamoely, Madagascar, Member
 Mrs. Maryam Uwais, Nigeria, Member

The Secretariat 

The Secretariat of the Committee is located in Maseru, in the Kingdom of Lesotho since December 2020.

See also

 African Charter on the Rights and Welfare of the Child

African
Organs of the African Union